A racing wheel is a control device for use in racing games, racing simulators, and driving simulators. They are usually packaged with a large paddle styled as a steering wheel, along with a set of pedals for accelerator, brake, and clutch, as well as transmission controls. An analog wheel and pedal set such as this allows the user to accurately manipulate steering angle and pedal control that is required to properly manage a simulated car, as opposed to digital control such as a keyboard. The relatively large range of motion further allows the user to more accurately apply the controls. Racing wheels have been developed for use with arcade games, game consoles, personal computers, and also for professional driving simulators for race drivers.

One of the earliest racing wheels for the PC mass market was the Thrustmaster Formula T1, released in 1994. It had no force feedback, only some form of spring-based centering resistance proportional to the steering angle. Two of the earliest FFB wheels for the consumer PC market were the Microsoft Sidewinder Force Feedback Wheel, released in 1997, and the Logitech Wingman Formula Force.

Force feedback
Racing wheels started off as simple plastic wheels hooked up to a rotary potentiometer, which were sprung by springs or bungees. These spring-based wheels had a reactive torque that increased proportionally only to the steering angle, without regard for the simulated vehicle dynamics.

Eventually manufacturers began to use electric motors in the controllers, in place of springs, in order to achieve a level of force feedback (sometimes abbreviated ), first seen in Microsoft's Sidewinder wheel. At first this technology simply provided the centering force and other artificial effects such as shaking the wheel in a crash or other vibrations. However, as driving simulations have evolved, their physics engines have become more elaborate, allowing also for linking the force feedback close to the simulated vehicle dynamics of the in-game physics. This allows the user to truly feel what forces go through the steering rack, instead of just artificial effects, and genuinely enhance the realism of the game. A fundamental factor for an adequate subjective steering-feel and perception of drivability from a force feedback wheel, is the transfer function from steering torque to steering angle.

In 2015, a preliminary comparison of gear-driven and direct-drive wheels in the 0–30 Hz frequency range, for a study on hard real-time multibody simulation and high-fidelity steering wheel force feedback, concluded that direct-drive wheels are preferable.

Buttons 

Sim racing wheels, like real-world racing steering wheels, can have many buttons. Some examples are cruise control or pit-lane limiter for the pit lane, button for flashing lights, windscreen wipers, radio communication with the team, adjustments to the racing setup (such as brake balance, brake migration, differential braking (entry, mid+, exit, hi-speed; to make use of torque effectively at different points in a corner), traction control (amplitude and sensitivity), anti-roll bar adjustment (front and rear), engine program (strat mode/ engine mode to get extra power or conserve fuel and engine life), engine braking (the engine's throttle or absence of throttle when there is no input from the gas pedal, i.e. whether the engine contributes to the car slowing down or is keeping its speed), etc.), seeing sideways or in the mirror, or to browse various menus (for example using a 7-way «funky switch»).

Comparison of racing wheels
Subsections by motor type: no FFB, gear- or belt-driven, and direct-drive wheels.

No FFB

Gear- and/or belt-driven

Earlier products

Gear-driven

Hybrid gear and belt-driven

Belt-driven

Direct-drive bases or wheel + base combos

Other types / uncategorized

Pedals
Other features by which pedals can be compared are whether they can be inverted (hanging pedals), build material (plastic, aluminum), adjustability (position, pressure, travel), measured pressure, travel length, sensor resolution.

Potentiometer-based and magnetic brake

Loadcell brake

Shifters

Notes

References

See also 
 HOTAS (hands on throttle-and-stick)
 Linkage (mechanical)
 List of Logitech Racing Wheels compatible games
 Sim racing
 Sawtooth wave

Game controllers
Racing simulators
Driving simulators